Gabriella Sarmiento Wilson (born June 27, 1997), known professionally as H.E.R. (pronounced "her", an acronym for "Having Everything Revealed"), is an American singer, songwriter, and musician. 
She has received several awards including an Academy Award, a Children's and Family Emmy Award, and five Grammy Awards, along with nominations for a Golden Globe Award, three American Music Awards, and four Billboard Music Awards.

After initial music appearances and singles under her real name, she re-emerged in 2016 as H.E.R., releasing her debut EP H.E.R. Volume 1 under RCA, followed by four subsequent EPs. 
Her first compilation album H.E.R. (2017), consisting of tracks from her first two EPs plus six additional songs, was nominated for five Grammy Awards, winning Best R&B Performance and Best R&B Album.
Her second compilation album, I Used to Know Her, received five Grammy Award nominations, including Album of the Year and Song of the Year for "Hard Place". 

In 2021, she was awarded the Grammy Award for Song of the Year for "I Can't Breathe". That same year, her song "Fight for You" from the film Judas and the Black Messiah, won the Academy Award for Best Original Song; and later earned the Grammy Award for Best Traditional R&B Performance, the following year. Her debut full-length album Back of My Mind was released in June 2021.

Early life, family and education
Gabriella Sarmiento Wilson was born on June 27, 1997, in Vallejo, California, to a Filipina American mother and an African American father and raised in California's San Francisco Bay Area.

Musical career

1997–2011: Career beginnings
At age ten, performing as Gabi Wilson, she played an Alicia Keys song on the piano for the Today Show and at the famed Apollo Theater in New York City on September 23, 2007, covering Aretha Franklin's "Freeway of Love". She made her acting debut at the age of 9, starring in the Nickelodeon television film School Gyrls. She also performed on Maury in 2007, Good Morning America, and The View in 2008. At this time, she was managed by Will Smith's Overbrook Entertainment. She performed at the 2010 BET Awards covering Keys' "Fallin'", sang a tribute to Keys at the ASCAP Awards, and competed on Radio Disney's The Next BIG Thing at age 12, with her song "My Music" featured on Radio Disney.

2011–2016: Debut album
In 2011, at age 14, Wilson signed a record deal with Sony's RCA Records via J Records, in a deal arranged by her manager Jeff Robinson's MBK Entertainment. Her debut single "Something to Prove" was released under her real name.

2016–present: Breakthrough

Rebranding in late 2016 with the new  H.E.R persona,  Wilson released her debut EP, H.E.R. Vol. 1 on September 9, 2016, produced by songwriter David "Swagg R'Celious" Harris. She received support from Usher, Tyrese, Pusha T, and Wyclef Jean; labelmates Alicia Keys and Bryson Tiller helped get the word out through Twitter co-signs, shoutouts, and re-posts. In April 2017, Barbadian singer Rihanna posted an Instagram clip with H.E.R.'s track "Focus" playing in the background. The clip has been viewed over 5 million times. Additional industry support came from Issa Rae of HBO's Insecure, Taraji P. Henson of Empire, Kylie Jenner, and Kendall Jenner.

NPR listed H.E.R. Vol. 1 as the first selection in its "5 Essential R&B Albums You Slept On". Calling the music "Slow-burning R&B that zooms in on emotional highs and lows," Rolling Stone included H.E.R. in its March 2017 "10 Artists You Need To Know" roundup. Forbes named her one of "5 Alternative R&B Artists to Look Out for in 2017", reporting: "In the same vein as The Weeknd's enigmatic introduction to the world, H.E.R.'s image remains a mystery. The irony, though, is that her moniker is an acronym for Having Everything Revealed."

Wilson's follow-up EP, H.E.R. Vol. 2 (2017) also produced by Harris, was released on June 16, 2017, and includes the single "Say It Again". She went on tour with Bryson Tiller for the Set It Off tour, and concluded her first headlining tour, the Lights On Tour, in support of H.E.R. Vol. 2. She released H.E.R. Vol. 2, The B Sides (2017), produced by Harris, on October 20, 2017, and the single "2" on October 13, 2017. The compilation album H.E.R. was released on October 20, 2017, comprising the songs from each of the three EP's in this series. The album won Best R&B Album and received four other nominations at the 61st Grammy Awards, including Album of the Year and Best New Artist.

Wilson announced in September 2018 the I Used to Know H.E.R. Tour in support of her EP series I Used to Know Her: The Prelude and I Used to Know Her: Part 2. Her second compilation album I Used to Know Her was released on August 30, 2019. She performed as one of the headliners of the 2019 Global Citizen Festival in Central Park, New York on September 28. On October 5, she participated in the 2019 edition of the Rock in Rio festival located in Rio de Janeiro, Brazil. Among the headliners were Drake, Foo Fighters, Bon Jovi, Red Hot Chili Peppers, Iron Maiden, Pink and Muse.

On September 20, 2020, she sang Prince's song "Nothing Compares 2 U" for the In Memoriam segment of the 72nd Primetime Emmy Awards. In February 2021, during the pre-game festivities for Super Bowl LV, she performed "America the Beautiful", singing and playing guitar. On June 17, 2021, her single "Damage" topped the US R&B radio chart. The song is from her debut full-length album Back of My Mind, which was released on June 18, 2021.

In August 2021, it was announced that Wilson was in final negotiations to make her feature film debut in the upcoming film adaptation of The Color Purple, playing the role of Squeak. She also sings a duet with Tauren Wells on the song called "Hold Us Together".

On November 30, 2021, the Apple Music Awards announced H.E.R. as the winner of Songwriter of the Year.

Musical style
Consisting mostly of R&B ballads, H.E.R.'s songs have been described as "downcast post-breakup material that sounded vulnerable and assured at once". In an interview, H.E.R. mentioned that she grew up listening to Filipino ballad singers such as Sharon Cuneta and Jay R.

Addressing the secrecy over her identity, she has said: "The mystery is a metaphor for who I am, or who I was at the time of creating the project... I feel like oftentimes we don't like to be open as people about our emotions or things that we are going through. At the time [of recording], I was very closed off except for when I was writing or when I was in the studio."

She explained further: "I am a voice for women who feel like they're alone in these situations. This project came from emotion, and that's what I want it to be about – not what I look like or who I'm with, but the raw emotion and support for women." To NPR she said, "I feel like this is the era of the anti-star. I really just wanted it to be about the music, and get away from, 'Who is she with?' and 'What is she wearing?

Media appearances
H.E.R. appeared as herself in the movie Yes Day (2021). She performed her original song "Change" on the episode "Active Citizenship" of the 2021 Netflix educational animated series We the People. On July 20, 2022, it was announced that H.E.R. would be singing the role of Belle for ABC's Beauty and the Beast: A 30th Celebration.

Discography

 Back of My Mind (2021)

Tours

Headlining tours 

 Lights on Tour (2017)
 I Used to Know Her Tour (2018)
 Back of My Mind Tour (2021)

Supporting 

 Bryson Tiller – Set It Off Tour (2017)
 Chris Brown – Heartbreak on a Full Moon Tour (2018)
Childish Gambino – This Is America Tour (2019)
Coldplay – Music of the Spheres World Tour (2022)

Awards and nominations

References

External links 

1997 births
Living people
21st-century African-American women singers
21st-century American women guitarists
African American female guitarists
African-American women singer-songwriters
American child musicians
American contemporary R&B singers
American musicians of Filipino descent
Ballad musicians
Best Original Song Academy Award-winning songwriters
Emmy Award winners
Grammy Award winners
Guitarists from California
Musicians from Vallejo, California
RCA Records artists
Singer-songwriters from California